The 1984 New Orleans Saints season was the team's 18th as a member of the National Football League. They were unable to improve on their previous season's output of 8–8, winning only seven games. The team failed to qualify for the playoffs for the eighteenth consecutive season. The Saints started out winning three of their first five games. However, the Saints would struggle as newly acquired quarterback Richard Todd threw 19 interceptions to just 11 touchdowns as the Saints again finished the season with a losing record at 7-9. It was in Week 6 against the Bears that Walter Payton passed Jim Brown to become the NFL's all time leading rusher.

Todd was acquired from the New York Jets for a first-round draft choice, and he beat out the aging Ken Stabler for the starting job at training camp, the Saints' last at Vero Beach, Florida. Stabler, who was inducted into the Pro Football Hall of Fame in 2016, retired midway through the season.

Late in the season, owner John Mecom Jr., who purchased the Saints as an expansion franchise for $8.5 million in late 1966, announced he would sell the team, with an asking price of $70 million. Fears abounded across Louisiana the team would be moved to Jacksonville if Mecom could not find a local buyer. Eventually, the team was sold in early 1985 to New Orleans native and car magnate Tom Benson, with Louisiana Governor Edwin Edwards brokering the deal.

Offseason

NFL draft

Personnel

Staff

Roster

Regular season

Transactions
October 10, 1984: The New Orleans Saints in exchange for their top choice in the 1985 NFL Draft to the Houston Oilers in exchange for running back Earl Campbell.

Schedule

Season summary

Week 1

Week 2

Week 3 (Sunday, September 16, 1984): at San Francisco 49ers 

Point spread: 49ers by 5½
 Over/Under: 45.0 (over)
 Time of Game:

Week 4

Week 5

Week 6

Week 7

Week 8

Week 9

Week 10

Week 11

Week 12

Week 13 (Sunday, November 25, 1984): vs. San Francisco 49ers 

Point spread: 49ers by 2
 Over/Under: 42.0 (under)
 Time of Game:

Week 14

Week 15

Week 16

Standings

References

New Orleans Saints seasons
New Orleans Saints
New